Fissuroma is a genus of fungi in the family Aigialaceae.

References

Pleosporales